Azu (born December 8, 1981) is a Japanese R&B singer. She is well known for her collaborations with rapper Seamo, such as her first major release, the leading track from Seamo's second album Live Goes On, "Kokoro no Koe".

Biography
Azu first began working in the Tokyo club scene at the age of 16. She explains the meaning behind her stage name as "Putting memories to all the words from A to Z and conveying them to you (U)." She began work with rapper Seamo in 2005, and worked as a background vocalist for a few of his tracks. In 2006, she featured as a fully fledged billed artist in the lead radio single from his second album, Live Goes On. The song, "Kokoro no Koe", was certified by the RIAJ for 100,000 cellphone downloads.

She debuted as an artist in her own right in 2007, with the single "Cherish". "Cherish" is used as the ending theme in the xxxHolic Shunmuki original video animation series. She continued to work with Seamo (for example, her first top 30 hit, "Jikan yo Tomare", featured him). To date, the pair have worked together on six songs together. "Jikan yo Tomare" is used as the second ending in the Itazura na Kiss anime series.

Her songs generally do better in the digital market (her biggest single in physical sales only sold 11,000 copies). Since November 2009, five of her songs have been certified gold by the RIAJ for cellphone downloads.

Azu released her second album in March 2010, Two of Us. Azu's single "For You" is used as the 12th ending theme for Naruto Shippuden. Azu's single "In My Life" is used as the third ending theme for Yorinuki Gintama-san. Azu composed the song "Akatsuki no Hana" for Akatsuki no Yona.

Azu announced her marriage to a man outside the music industry in May 2017, and she gave birth to a daughter on August 6, 2018.

Discography

Albums

Singles

* Japan Hot 100 established February 2008, RIAJ Digital Track Chart established April 2009.

Other appearances

References

External links
 Azu's official website 
 Azu's Ameblo blog 

Living people
1981 births
People from Mie Prefecture
Sony Music Entertainment Japan artists
Japanese pop musicians
Musicians from Mie Prefecture
21st-century Japanese singers
21st-century Japanese women singers